The Hash House Harriers (HHH or H3) is an international group of non-competitive running social clubs. An event organized by a club is known as a Hash or Run, or a Hash Run. A common denominal verb for this activity is Hashing, with participants calling themselves Hashers. Male members are referred to as Harriers, which females are known as Hariettes.

The Hash is humorously known as A Drinking Club With A Running Problem, with the preferred beverage of consumption being beer.

History
Hashing originated in December 1938 in Kuala Lumpur, Selangor, then in the Federated Malay States (now Malaysia). A group of British immigrants began meeting on Friday evenings prior to the war (1938-1941), but switched to Monday evenings (starting in 1946) to run, in a fashion patterned after the traditional British paper chase or "Hare & Hounds". Apart from the excitement of chasing the Hare and finding the trail, Harriers reaching the end of the trail would partake of beer, ginger beer, and cigarettes. With hash names in parentheses, the original members included Albert Stephen Ignatius Gispert ("G"), Cecil Lee, Frederick Thomson ("Horse"), Ronald Bennett ("Torch"), Eric Galvin, H.M. Doig, and John Woodrow.

A. S. Gispert suggested the name "Hash House Harriers" after the Selangor Club Annex, where several of the original hashers lived and dined, known as the "Hash House". The "Hash House" got its name for "its hodgepodge of edible servings being passed off for food". The term hash was used as an old British slang for "bad food".

Hashing died out during World War II, shortly after the Invasion of Malaya, but was restarted in 1946 after the war by several of the original group. A. S. Gispert was killed on 11 February 1942 in the Japanese invasion of Singapore, an event commemorated by many chapters by an annual Gispert Memorial Run.

After World War II, in an attempt to reorganize in the city of Kuala Lumpur, hashers were informed by the Registrar of Societies that since they were a "group", they would require a constitution. The objectives of the Hash House Harriers as recorded on the club registration card dated 1950 are:

 To promote physical fitness among our members
 To get rid of weekend hangovers
 To acquire a good thirst and to satisfy it in beer
 To persuade the older members that they are not as old as they feel

In 1962, Ian Cumming founded the second chapter in Singapore. Chapters are commonly called Kennels, following in tradition to similar Hound & Hare clubs. The idea spread through the Far East and the South Pacific, Europe, and North America, expanding rapidly during the mid-1970s.

At present, there are almost 1500 chapters in all parts of the world, with members distributing newsletters, directories, and magazines, and organizing regional and world hashing events. As of 2003, there are even two organized chapters operating in Antarctica.

Events

Regular meetings 
Most hashing clubs gather on a weekly or monthly basis. However, some events occur sporadically, e.g., February 29th, Friday the 13th, Typhoon 'T8' or a full moon.

At a hash, one or more members ("hares") lay a trail, which is then followed by the remainder of the group (the "pack" or "hounds"). Paper, flour, or chalk are usually used to mark the trail. The trail periodically ends at a "check". The pack must find where it begins again; often, the trail includes false trails, short cuts, dead ends, check backs, and splits. These features are designed to keep the pack together despite differences in fitness level or running speed, as front-runners are forced to slow down to find the "true" trail, allowing stragglers to catch up.

Members sometimes describe their group as "a drinking club with a running problem", indicating that the social element of an event is as important, if not more so than any athleticism involved. Beer remains an integral part of a hash. However, the balance between running and drinking differs between chapters, with some groups placing more focusing more on socializing and others on running.

Generally, hash events are open to the public and require no reservation or membership, but most require a small fee, referred to as "hash cash", to cover the costs incurred, such as food or drink, and the club treasurer may also be nicknamed "Hash Cash".

Some hash clubs have a hash home, which could be a bar, restaurant, resort, or a sports club. In that case, the hash always or almost always starts at the hash home. The club may then transport the hashers to some other location to start the run. Other clubs simply post the start on the internet, and the hashers make their own way to that location. The run will then start and finish at that location.

Many hash clubs are in college or university towns, in which case the hashers are probably young, and most will run the trails. Other clubs might be in areas with an older population, so they will probably walk the trails. In the United States, hash clubs tend to have a large number of armed forces veterans. Some hash clubs meet at night, which means that the runners might need a flashlight to find the marks. Some hash clubs are men only, some women only, but most are mixed. Some are very adult-oriented, which means bawdy drinking songs, etc. Others are family-oriented. There are many informal groups attached to various hash chapters. For example, the regular hash meets every Saturday, but there may be an informal group that meets on, say, Wednesday to research trails.

Socializing 
The end of a trail is an opportunity to socialize, have a drink, and observe any traditions of the individual chapter (see Traditions). When the hash officially ends, many members may continue socializing at an "on-after," "on-down," "on-on-on," "apres," or "hash bash," an event held at a nearby house, pub, or restaurant.

Special events

In addition to regularly scheduled hashes, a club or chapter may also organize other events or themed runs. Many also hold special events on their anniversaries or when they reach a milestone in the number of runs, e.g. for run number 100, 200, 777, 1000, etc. This may include a special weekend with several runs and evening celebrations

Red dress runs 
An event held annually by some chapters is the "Red Dress Run". In 1987, Donna Rhinehart was taken to a hash in Long Beach, California, to be introduced to the sport. She was invited to "wait in the truck" until her host returned. Instead Rhinehart joined the hash in her red dress. The following year, the San Diego Hash House Harriers sent Rhinehart an airline ticket to attend the inaugural "Red Dress Run". Hundreds of hashers wore red dresses for the event which was widely covered by local media. In addressing the crowd, Rhinehart, or "The Lady in Red" as she became known, suggested that such hashes might be held to raise funds for local charities. The event quickly spread around the globe to places such as Beijing, Montreal, Helsinki, Osan/Yangsan Hashers, Moscow, Tokyo, New Orleans, Washington DC and Hobart in Australia. Over the years, it has raised millions of dollars for charity. The New Orleans Hash House Harriers attracted 7,000 participants to their Red Dress Run in 2010, raising more than $200,000 for 50 local charities.

Today the Red Dress Run is another part of the Hash House Harriers' heritage. Rhinehart died in 2013 as the Hash House Harriers were celebrating the 25th anniversary of their Red Dress Run.

Variations
 Hash House Bikers (Bike hashes or bashes) follow normal hashing traditions with the hare and pack riding bicycles.  The two oldest bike hash chapters or kennels are Singapore Bike Hash (July 1989) and Bike-O-Psycho in Orlando, Florida (July 1991).
 River hashes or snorkel hashes (rashes, splashes, or snatches) follow normal hashing traditions, but take place in an aquatic environment with participants using snorkels, fins, kayaks, floats, and other rafts. First documented underwater/scuba Hash trail was in Sharm El Sheikh, Egypt by Cairo H3 in 1990.
 Snowshoe hashes are much like normal trails, but the hare and hounds are in the snow, on snowshoes. Marking trails with white flour or with colored chalk is impractical on snow, so flour can be colored using carpenter's chalk (most common practice) or jello mix (which will be more vibrant when it gets wet from the snow). This practice is commonly used on all winter hash trails in snowy regions, not just snowshoe hashing. Squirts of colored water may be attempted but it has a tendency to be further diluted by the snow and also melts the snow and thus travels below the surface becoming less visible than colored flour. 
 SKASH is a Ski Hash, accomplished on skis. 
 Hash-a-thon, tour-duh-hash, Hash challenge and tri-hash-thon are special "competitive" events. Hash-a-thons involve multiple trails (normally 4) in 24-hour period totaling up to 26.2 miles (a marathon). Tour-duh-Hash is 7 days of hashing. Hash challenge is a team event (3–4 hashers) who complete a 42 km hash through the Malaysian jungle. Tri-hash-thon is an event consisting of 3 trails: 1 running, 1 swimming/snorkeling/river float, and 1 biking (bash).
 Family hashes welcome children (sometimes called hash house horrors or ankle biters) with soft drinks replacing alcoholic beverages and drinking songs toned down appropriately.
 Pick up hashes – Hashes that follow traditional hashing guidelines minus the pre-selection of a hare. At a pick up hash, the hare is decided randomly at the beginning of the event.
 Disaster Hash – A disaster hash is basically an impromptu hash that can be called by any hash member whenever a disaster occurs. The disaster can be anywhere in the world and can range from an earthquake to a flat tire. The disaster hash differs by two major hash components, the hares and hash names. The hare is chosen on the spot, given flour, a destination, and a one-minute head start. Whoever catches the hare, becomes the hare. They take the flour and continue along to the destination, this repeats as many times as the hare is caught. Secondly, disaster hashers are given special disaster hash names. All virgins get named at a disaster hash, usually having to do with the disaster in question and the disaster hash name is completely separate to a normal hash.

Trails
Hashing has not strayed far from its roots in Kuala Lumpur (and before that as games 'Hare and Hounds' and 'paper chase'). The hares mark their trail with paper, chalk, sawdust, strings or coloured flour, depending on the environment and weather.

Special marks may be used to indicate a false trail, a backtrack, a shortcut, or a turn. The most commonly used mark is a "check", indicating that hashers will have to search in any direction to find the continuation of the trail. Trails may contain a "beer check", where the pack stops to consume beer, water, or snacks, allowing any stragglers to catch up to the group.

Trails may pass through any sort of terrain and hashers may run through back alleyways, residential areas, city streets, forests, swamps, deep mud ("shiggy") or shopping malls and may climb fences, ford streams, explore storm drains or scale cliffs in their pursuit of the hare.

Signals and terms
Hashers often carry horns or whistles to communicate with each other, in addition to verbal communication. Every hash house employs its own set of trail marks, and the names for these marks may vary widely, so newcomers or visitors will have the local markings explained to them before the run at a "chalk talk." The most common term is "on-on," shouted by runners to let others know they are on the right trail. A yell of "R-U?" (pronounced "are you") is a question to other hashers if they are on trail – it should be responded with either "On-On" or "Looking or Checking."

Sometimes there is a call to "circle up" – this is a call from a leader for the hashers to form a circle, be quiet, and pay attention. Circles are called for the "chalk talk" to give news, or for some ceremony such as to thank the hare for the hash.

Trail markings
Each hare should explain their markings at the start of the trail (see "Chalk Talk" above") as some marks like X or O may have completely different meanings depending on the local custom and can sometimes even vary from hare to hare within the same kennel. Many clubs around the world still use shredded or small squares of paper, but due to litter laws and other environmental concerns, most clubs have transitioned to chalk or flour, but other substances may be used too, e.g. saw dust, colored powder, or pieces of toilet paper.

Trail types
There are two types of trails. "Live trails" are laid by hares who are given a head start, while "dead trails" are pre-laid hours or days before the hash begins. Live trails and dead trails are also known as "live hare" and "dead hare" trails, respectively. Live trails are closer to the original "hare and hound" tradition, with the intent of the pack being to catch the hare rather than making it to the end, and are more common in the United States, while the rest of the world tends toward dead trails.

A trail may be "A to A," where the trail returns to the start, or "A to B," where the beginning and end of the trail are widely separated. Some trails are referred to as "A to A′ (prime)," denoting an ending point that is close to (usually short walking distance), but not the same as the start. There is also "B to A," in which the participants are ferried to another location for the run back to the gathering point.

The hash trail depends on the environment of the hash chapter. If there are hills or mountains nearby, that is always the preferred location. Many trails run through rural areas, such as forests, farm areas, jungle, along with or through rivers, etc. In densely populated areas, the hash will often start and finish in a public park, and the trails will run on city streets.

Traditions

Circles
Most hash events end with a group gathering known as "circle," or less commonly as "religion." Led by chapter leadership, the circle provides a time to socialize, sing drinking songs, recognize individuals, formally name members, or inform the group of pertinent news or upcoming events. Circles may be led by the chapter grandmaster (GM), the group's religious advisor (RA), or by a committee. Impromptu input is welcome and solicited.

Down-downs
A "down-down" is a means of punishing, rewarding, or merely recognizing an individual for any action or behavior according to the customs or whims of the group. Generally, the individual in question is asked to consume without pause the contents of his or her drinking vessel or risk pouring the remaining contents on his or her head. Individuals may be recognized for outstanding service or their status as a visitor or newcomer. Down-downs also serve as punishment for misdemeanors real, imagined, or blatantly made up. Such transgressions may include: failing to stop at the beer check, pointing with a finger, pronouncing the letter "r," or using real names. Commonly, hashers who wear new shoes to an event can be required to drink from that shoe.

Many chapters include an ice seat or throne as part of the down-down ceremony. Those who are to consume a down-down sit on a large block of ice while they await the completion of the down-down song. If the offense that resulted in the down-down is particularly egregious, the hasher may be subjected to a long song with many verses.

Hash Names
In most chapters, the use of real names during an event is discouraged. Members are typically given a "hash name," usually in deference to a particularly notorious escapade, a personality trait, or their physical appearance. In some chapters, the name must be earned – that is, Hashers are not named until they have done something outstanding, unusual, or stupid enough to warrant one. In other chapters, the process is more mechanical, and Hashers are named after completing a certain number of events (5–10 being the most common) or setting their first run (sometimes referred to as a Virgin Hare).

Naming conventions differ from Kennel to Kennel, with some focusing on "family-friendly" names (for example: Lost My Way), innuendo (for example, Purple Vein), and some go out of their way to make the name as bawdy, offensive, or politically incorrect as possible. But in general, once named, Hashers will refer to you by that name at the Hash irrespective of the Hash itself. For the more offensive names, it might be censored in comical ways to comply with the family-friendly tone of other Kennels, but typically it is kept as-is.

Hashers who have not been named are generally referred to as "Just (Name)," "No Name (Name)" (e.g., "No Name John"), or simply "Virgin."

Naming traditions are also differ based on Kennels. In some, the Grand Master (GM) has the responsibility, while others have the Religious Advisor (RA) do the ceremony. Others still allow the Hares themselves to name the Hasher. In some, the Circle gets to help and shout out suggestions. However, as a general rule, Hashers are not permitted to give themselves a Hash Name due to the obvious conflict of interest. Hashers who do so are often renamed by the chapter at the earliest opportunity and with a more offensive name. Hashers who do get named and do not like their name may be renamed by their Kennel or by another Kennel. Usually, this backfires as Hashers typically strive to give the complaining Hasher an even more offensive or further inappropriate name. Similarly, new Hashers who pursue a desire for an obviously offensive or inappropriate name may intentionally be given a weaker name, such as "Freckles," "Frog Butt," or "Mr. Poo Poo."

Symbols & Logos
Many Hashes have their own logo for their own Kennel. There are even custom logos made for special events like the [Interhash]. However, due to the running theme, there are many common symbols universally attributed to the Hash that can be seen across multiple items. One such traditional symbol is the outline of a human foot (or a pair), often including the phrase "On-On."

Hash T-shirts are among the most common things to find at a Hash, and some consider them collection material. Unique Hashes and special events usually have a Hash T-shirt that comes from recognizing participation, and carry the symbols of various Kennels, dates, Hares of the run, event locations, sponsors, and more. A large sample is available in the Digital Hash T-shirt Museum

Clothing
Hashers occasionally wear specialized clothing on trail or to the closing circles. Common items include thick, knee-high socks (commonly referred to as "Shiggy" socks), kilts, or "happi" coats, while some chapters (aka "kennels" in hare-and-hound chapters) offer "earned" clothing such as bibs or sashes. Shiggy socks are worn to protect the shins and knees of the wearer from thorns, mud, branches, or whatever else they run through. The Hash has its own tartan for members' kilts. Custom happi coats, originating out of Japan, are also commonly seen and made to reflect the local kennel.

Hash Hymn
Swing Low, Sweet Chariot is the Hash Hymn. All Hashers recognize the Hash Hymn, and it usually commands as much respect as possible. While humorous additions or renditions to the song itself exist, it is one of the few things that remain consistent throughout the Hashing world. There is some dispute to the song's origin; however,  its persistence in the Hashing world would suggest it originated in the Singapore H3 or even from Mother H3 itself.

International events
There are several international events, where hashers from different groups get together to run and socialize. Still, the most famous is the biennial Interhash, where hashers from around the world gather.
The 2006 Interhash—Chiang Mai offered supporting runs in Thailand, Myanmar, Laos, Vietnam, Cambodia, and southwest China. The 2018 event was scheduled for the weekend of 27 May on the Fiji Islands.
 1978 Hong Kong
 1980 Kuala Lumpur, Malaysia
 1982 Jakarta, Indonesia
 1984 Sydney, Australia
 1986 Pattaya, Thailand
 1988 Bali, Indonesia
 1990 Manila, Philippines
 1992 Phuket, Thailand
 1994 Rotorua, New Zealand
 1996 Limassol, Cyprus
 1998 Kuala Lumpur, Malaysia
 2000 Tasmania, Australia
 2002 Goa, India
 2004 Cardiff, Wales
 2006 Chiang Mai, Thailand
 2008 Perth, Australia
 2010 Kuching, Malaysia
 2012 Jogjakarta, Indonesia
 2014 Hainan, China
 2016 Bali, Indonesia
 2018 Nadi, Fiji  
 Cancelled: 2020 Trinidad and Tobago, Trinidad 
 2022 Goa, India - November 2022
 2022 Koh Samui Thailand - December 1,000th Hash
 2024 Christchurch, New Zealand    

In addition to Interhash, there are also many regional and continental hash events, such as the Inter-Americas, InterAfrica, InterGulf, InterScandi, EuroHash, and PanAsia. National hash events or "nash hashes" primarily bring together hashers from one particular nation, although visitors from other countries are actively welcomed.

InterAmericas Hashes
 1984-Costa Rica
 1985-Atlanta
 1987-Philadelphia
 1989-San Diego
 1991-Waukesha
 1993-Calgary
 1995-Orlando
 1997-Trinidad
 1999-Pittsburgh
 2001-Austin
 2003-Costa Rica
 2005-Toronto
 2007-Mexico
 2009-Colorado
 2011-Savannah
 2013-Panama
 2015-Portland
 2017-Phoenix
 2019-HashBoat
 2021 - postponed to 2023
 2023-Colombia

References

External links

 The World Harrier Organization
 Hash House and Hash Heritage
 World Hash Links
  Chapters in Europe 
 A. S. Gispert (Alberto Esteban Ignacio Gispert)
 Red Dress Run information
 Hash challenge information
 Harrier Magazine
 "Beer runners’ flour trail a recipe for trouble", msnbc, August 25, 2007

Running clubs
Outdoor locating games
British inventions
1938 introductions
1938 establishments in British Malaya